Camilla is Queen Consort of the United Kingdom and 14 other Commonwealth realms as the wife of King Charles III. She has received numerous titles, decorations, and honorary appointments during her time as both the wife of the heir apparent and the consort of the sovereign. Where two dates are shown, the first indicates the date of receiving the title or award and the second indicates the date of its loss or renunciation.

Royal and noble titles and styles

Upon marrying Charles, Camilla's full title became "Her Royal Highness Princess Charles Phillip Arthur George, Princess of Wales, Duchess of Cornwall, Duchess of Rothesay, Countess of Chester, Countess of Carrick, Baroness of Renfrew, Lady of the Isles, Princess of Scotland". She was commonly styled "Her Royal Highness The Duchess of Cornwall". In Scotland she was known as "Her Royal Highness The Duchess of Rothesay". 

Although Camilla was legally Princess of Wales, she adopted the feminine form of her husband's highest-ranking subsidiary title, Duke of Cornwall, because the title "Princess of Wales" had become strongly associated with Charles's first wife, Diana. 
In 2021, upon the death of Prince Philip, Duke of Edinburgh, Charles inherited his father's titles, and Camilla thus became Duchess of Edinburgh, Countess of Merioneth and Baroness Greenwich.

When Charles III succeeded his mother, Elizabeth II, as king, Camilla automatically became queen in accordance with English common law. Clarence House however stated on the occasion of their wedding in 2005 that she would adopt the style of a princess consort instead of queen consort, but there is no legal or historical precedent for such a title. In her 2022 Accession Day message, published to mark the 70th anniversary of her reign, Elizabeth II stated that it was her "sincere wish" for Camilla to be known as queen consort upon Charles's accession to the throne.

Camilla has been styled "Her Majesty The Queen Consort" since the official statement released by Buckingham Palace announcing the death of Elizabeth II on 8 September 2022. When conversing with the Queen, the correct etiquette is to address her initially as Your Majesty and thereafter as Ma'am (pronounced , with a short 'a' as in jam).  Although thus far she has been referred to as "Queen Consort" in statements and briefings from Buckingham Palace, as the wife of the king, she is entitled to be referred to as "Her Majesty The Queen", which is her legal title. Historically, queens regnant and queen consorts alike have been referred to as "The Queen" during their incumbency.

Commonwealth honours

Appointments (Shown in order in which appointments were made, not order of precedence)

Decorations and medals (Shown in order in which appointments were made, not order of precedence)

Foreign honours

Appointments (Shown in order in which appointments were made, not order of precedence)

Decorations and medals (Shown in order in which appointments were made, not order of precedence)

Honorary military appointments

 
  2012: Colonel-in-Chief, The Royal Australian Corps of Military Police

 
  2011: Colonel-in-Chief, The Queen's Own Rifles of Canada

 
  2006: Commodore-in-Chief of the Naval Medical Services
  2007: Lady Sponsor of 
  2007: Royal Colonel of the 4th Battalion of The Rifles
  2008: Honorary Air Commodore of RAF Halton
  2008: Honorary Air Commodore of RAF Leeming
  2009: Commodore-in-Chief Naval Chaplaincy Service
  2017: Lady Sponsor of 
  2020: Colonel-in-Chief, The Rifles
  2020: Colonel-in-Chief, Special Reconnaissance Regiment
  2022: Colonel of the Grenadier Guards

Non-national titles and honours

Livery companies

Charity Awards

Scholastic
 Chancellor, visitor, governor, and fellowships

Honorary degrees

See also
 List of titles and honours of Charles III
 List of titles and honours of William, Prince of Wales
 List of titles and honours of Catherine, Princess of Wales 
 List of titles and honours of Anne, Princess Royal
 List of titles and honours of Elizabeth II
 List of titles and honours of Prince Philip, Duke of Edinburgh
 List of titles and honours of George VI
 List of titles and honours of Queen Elizabeth The Queen Mother
 List of titles and honours of Mary of Teck
 List of titles and honours of Prince Arthur, Duke of Connaught and Strathearn

References

Camilla, Queen Consort
Lists of titles by person of the United Kingdom
British monarchy-related lists
Commonwealth royal styles